Client (stylised as CLIEИT) is the self-titled debut album by English electronic music group Client. It was released on 18 August 2003 by Toast Hawaii.

Critical reception
Client was met with "mixed or average" reviews from critics. At Metacritic, which assigns a weighted average rating out of 100 to reviews from mainstream publications, this release received an average score of 52 based on 8 reviews.

In a review for AllMusic, David Jeffries wrote "Client wear their cleverness on their sleeve and go out of their way to explain how dangerous they are. Lyrics are filled with attention-grabbing innuendo that sounds forced, and the music is drab and underdeveloped. The nameless women behind it all (Client A and Client B) give potential remixers plenty to work with on the inspired "Pills", but the simple melodies throughout the album wear out their welcome quickly.

Track listing

Personnel
Credits adapted from Client album liner notes.

 Client – production
 DJ Brass – photography
 Louise Downer – artwork design
 Scott Fairbrother – guitar (3, 6, 8); bass (8)
 Sie Medway-Smith – drum programming, additional programming
 Matt Nida – web design
 Mandy Parnell – mastering
 Paul.A.Taylor – logo
 Paul Tipler – mixing
 Felix Todd – backing vocals (8); vocal production (2–5, 7, 8, 11)

Release history

References

2003 debut albums
Client (band) albums
Mute Records albums
Toast Hawaii (record label) albums